Washingtonian may to refer to people from:
 Washington (state)
 List of people from Washington
 Washington, D.C.
 List of people from Washington, D.C.

Washingtonian may also refer to:

 Washingtonian (Amtrak train), a former Amtrak service
 Washingtonian (B&M train), a named passenger train of the Boston and Maine Railroad
 Washingtonian (B&O train), a named passenger train of the Baltimore and Ohio Railroad in the 1930s–1950s
 Washingtonian (magazine), a cultural magazine in Washington, D.C.
 Washingtonian movement, a 19th-century temperance movement in the United States
 "The Washingtonians" (2007), Masters of Horror episode
 SS Washingtonian, a cargo ship launched in 1913
 The Washingtonians, a band formed by Duke Ellington